Derrick E. Frost (born November 25, 1980) is a former American football punter. He was signed by the Philadelphia Eagles as an undrafted free agent in 2003.  He played college football at Northern Iowa.

Frost has been a member of the Baltimore Ravens, Cleveland Browns, Washington Redskins, Green Bay Packers, and California Redwoods.

Early years
Frost attended Clayton High School in Clayton, Missouri, and as a student was a letterman in football and baseball.  In football, he was an All-Conference selection as a quarterback, linebacker, punter, and kicker.

College career
Frost attended the University of Northern Iowa and was a good student and a letterman in football and baseball.  In football, during his college career, Frost punted 104 times for 4388 yards (42.19 yards per punt avg.).

Professional career
In 2003, he was signed by the Philadelphia Eagles as an undrafted rookie free agent, but eventually wound up being signed by the Cleveland Browns.  He completed two seasons at Cleveland before moving to the Washington Redskins.

Washington Redskins
In the 2006 season Frost has had success with nine 40+ punts.  Also he had a couple of 50 plus punts for the Redskins of late after Week 12 in the league.

During the 2007 preseason game against the Tennessee Titans, Frost raced out after a punt to level the Titan's punt returner causing a forced fumble.

In 2008, he battled rookie Durant Brooks for the punting job.  He was cut on August 30 during final cuts;

Green Bay Packers
Two days after being released by the Redskins, Frost was signed by the Green Bay Packers, who previously cut Jon Ryan.  Frost was released by the Packers on December 1, 2008. Head coach Mike McCarthy stated that Frost performed well in practices, but did not do well during the games.

California Redwoods
Frost was signed by the California Redwoods of the United Football League on September 2, 2009. He was released on October 25, 2009.

Post Football
Frost is president of Profusion Financial and is a member of the board of directors of the NFLPA.

References

External links
Just Sports Stats
United Football League bio

1980 births
Living people
Players of American football from St. Louis
American football placekickers
American football punters
Northern Iowa Panthers football players
Philadelphia Eagles players
Baltimore Ravens players
Cleveland Browns players
Washington Redskins players
Green Bay Packers players
Sacramento Mountain Lions players